"That Old Wheel" is a song written by Jennifer Pierce and recorded by Johnny Cash together with Hank Williams Jr. for Cash's Jack Clement–produced 1988 album Water from the Wells of Home.

Released in September 1988 as the lead single from the album, the song reached number 21 on U.S. Billboard country chart for the week of December 3. The other side of the single was a recording of Cash singing "Tennessee Flat Top Box" from the 1988 album Classic Cash – Hall of Fame Series.

Content 
The song is a country ballad which philosophically talks about two friends who "roll along thought life like 'that old wheel'".

History 
When Cash and Jack Clement were working on Cash's second Mercury album, they came with the idea to team up with artists who were popular right now. And one of such artists would be Hank Williams Jr.

Moreover, Hank Williams Jr. was a longtime friend of Cash. In his book on Johnny Cash, C. Eric Banister quotes him saying, "I worked with Hank Jr. when he was fifteen, sixteen years old. He was part of my show, and he was stealing the show from me. I always wanted to have him on one of my records and we finally found a song."

The album concept, especially the idea of a duet with Hank Williams Jr., appealed to record company executive Steve Popovich.

The song would be eventually chosen as the lead single from the album.

Despite all the expectations, the song went only to number 21 on the Billboard country chart.

Track listing

Charts

References

External links 
 "That Old Wheel" (feat. Hank Williams, Jr.) on the Johnny Cash official website

Johnny Cash songs
1988 songs
1988 singles
Song recordings produced by Jack Clement
Mercury Records singles